A matrix metalloproteinase inhibitor (MMPI) inhibits matrix metalloproteinases. As they inhibit cell migration they have antiangiogenic effects. They may be both endogenous and exogenous.

The most notorious endogenous metalloproteinases are tissue inhibitors of metalloproteinases (TIMPs). There are also cartilage-derived angiogenesis inhibitors.

Exogenous matrix metalloproteinase inhibitors were developed as anticancer drugs. Examples include:
 Batimastat
 Cipemastat
 Ilomastat
 Marimastat
 MMI270
 Prinomastat
 Rebimastat
 Ro 28-2653
 Tanomastat

Metalloproteinase inhibitors are found in numerous marine organisms, including fish, cephalopods, mollusks, algae, and bacteria.

See also
 Drug discovery and development of MMP inhibitors

References 

Angiology
Biochemistry